Kirov may refer to:
Sergei Kirov (1886–1934), Soviet Bolshevik leader in Leningrad after whom all other entries are named
Kirov (surname)

Places

Armenia
Amrakits or Kirov
Taperakan or Kirov

Azerbaijan
Kirov, Baku
Kirov, Lankaran
Kirov, Samukh
Kirov, Shusha

Kyrgyzstan
Kirov, Jalal-Abad, a village in Nooken District, Jalal-Abad Region
Kirov, Panfilov, a village in Panfilov District, Chuy Region
Kirov, Ysyk-Ata, a village in Ysyk-Ata District, Chuy Region
Kirov, Kara-Suu, a village in Kara-Suu District, Osh Region
Kirov, Özgön, a village in Özgön District, Osh Region

Russia
Kirov, Kirov Oblast, a city and the administrative center of Kirov Oblast
Kirov, Kaluga Oblast, a town in Kaluga Oblast
Kirov, Republic of Adygea, a khutor in Shovgenovsky District of the Republic of Adygea
Kirov, Sakha Republic, a selo in Nyurbinsky District of the Sakha Republic
Kirov Bridge, a bridge across the Daugava in Vitebsk, Belarus
Kirov Islands, a Russian archipelago in the Kara Sea
Kirov Square, Yekaterinburg, Russia

Military
Kirov-class cruiser, a Soviet class of conventional cruisers
Soviet cruiser Kirov, the lead ship of the Kirov-class cruisers, launched in 1936
Kirov-class battlecruiser, a Soviet nuclear-powered cruiser class
Soviet battlecruiser Kirov, the lead ship of the Kirov-class battlecruisers, launched in 1977

Theatre
Kirov Theatre, the name by which the Mariinsky Theatre in Saint Petersburg was known from 1935 to 1992
Kirov Orchestra, the former name of the Orchestra of the Mariinsky Theatre
Kirov Ballet, the former name of the Mariinsky Ballet
Kirov Academy of Ballet, a ballet school in Washington D.C.

See also
Imeni Kirova (disambiguation)
Kirov, Russia, a list of inhabited localities in Russia
Kirovka (disambiguation)
Kirovsk (disambiguation)
Kirovsky (disambiguation)